Bear Canyon mammarenavirus (BCNV), is a Mammarenavirus similar to Whitewater Arroyo virus (WWAV) and Tamiami mammarenavirus (TAMV); all three being New World arenaviruses. The virus is named after Bear Canyon, the area it was originally discovered in.

References

Arenaviridae